Matthew II may refer to:

Matthew II Csák (d. 1283/1284)
Pope Matthew II of Alexandria (r. 1453–1466)
Patriarch Matthew II of Constantinople (r. three times, shortly in 1596, from 1598 to 1602 and for a few days in 1603)
Matthew II of Armenia (1845–1910), Catholicos of All Armenians

See also
Matthew 2